Collective operations are building blocks for interaction patterns, that are often used in SPMD algorithms in the parallel programming context. Hence, there is an interest in efficient realizations of these operations.

A realization of the collective operations is provided by the Message Passing Interface (MPI).

Definitions 
In all asymptotic runtime functions, we denote the latency , the communication cost per word , the number of processing units  and the input size per node . In cases where we have initial messages on more than one node we assume that all local messages are of the same size. To address individual processing units we use .

If we do not have an equal distribution, i.e. node  has a message of size , we get an upper bound for the runtime by setting .

A distributed memory model is assumed. The concepts are similar for the shared memory model. However, shared memory systems can provide hardware support for some operations like broadcast for example, which allows convenient concurrent read. Thus, new algorithmic possibilities can become available.

Broadcast  

The broadcast pattern is used to distribute data from one processing unit to all processing units, which is often needed in SPMD parallel programs to dispense input or global values. Broadcast can be interpreted as an inverse version of the reduce pattern. Initially only root  with   stores message . During broadcast  is sent to the remaining processing units, so that eventually  is available to all processing units.

Since an implementation by means of a sequential for-loop with  iterations becomes a bottleneck, divide-and-conquer approaches are common. One possibility is to utilize a binomial tree structure with the requirement that  has to be a power of two.

Binomial trees have a problem with long messages . The receiving unit of  can only propagate the message to other units, after it received the whole message. In the meantime, the communication network is not utilized. Therefore pipelining on binary trees is used, where  is split into an array of  packets of size . The packets are then broadcast one after another, so that data is distributed fast in the communication network.

Reduce 

The reduce pattern is used to collect data or partial results from different processing units and to combine them into a global result by a chosen operator. Given  processing units, message  is on processing unit  initially. The reduction operator  must be associative at least. Some algorithms require a commutative operator with a neutral element.

Implementation considerations are similar to broadcast. For pipelining on binary trees the message must be representable as a vector of smaller object for component-wise reduction.

All-Reduce 

The all-reduce pattern (also called allreduce) is used if the result of a reduce operation must be distributed to all processing units. Given  processing units, message  is on processing unit  initially. All  are aggregated by an operator  and the result is eventually stored on all . Analog to the reduce operation, the operator  must be at least associative.

All-reduce can be interpreted as a reduce operation with a subsequent broadcast. For long messages a corresponding implementation is suitable, whereas for short messages, the latency can be reduced by using a hypercube topology, if  is a power of two. All-reduce can also be implemented with a butterfly algorithm and achieve optimal latency and bandwidth.

All-reduce implemented with a butterfly algorithm achieves the same asymptotic runtime.

Prefix-Sum/Scan 

The prefix-sum or scan operation is used to collect data or partial results from different processing units and to compute intermediate results by an operator, which are stored on those processing units. It can be seen as a generalization of the reduce operation. Given  processing units, message  is on processing unit . The operator  must be at least associative, whereas some algorithms require also a commutative operator and a neutral element. Eventually processing unit  stores the prefix sum . In the case of the so-called exclusive prefix sum, processing unit  stores the prefix sum . Some algorithms require to store the overall sum at each processing unit in addition to the prefix sums.

For short messages, this can be achieved with a hypercube topology if  is a power of two. For long messages, the hypercube topology is not suitable, since all processing units are active in every step and therefore pipelining can't be used. A binary tree topology is better suited for arbitrary  and long messages.

Prefix-sum on a binary tree can be implemented with an upward and downward phase. In the upward phase reduction is performed, while the downward phase is similar to broadcast, where the prefix sums are computed by sending different data to the left and right children. With this approach pipelining is possible, because the operations are equal to reduction and broadcast.

Barrier 

The barrier as a collective operation is a generalization of the concept of a barrier, that can be used in distributed computing. When a processing unit calls barrier, it waits until all other processing units have called barrier as well. Barrier is thus used to achieve global synchronization in distributed computing.

One way to implement barrier is to call all-reduce with an empty/ dummy operand.

Gather 

The gather communication pattern is used to store data from all processing units on a single processing unit. Given  processing units, message  on processing unit . Gather can be thought of as a reduce operation that uses the concatenation operator. This works due to the fact that concatenation is associative. We see that the asymptotic runtime is similar to the asymptotic runtime of reduce , but with the addition of a factor p to the term . This additional factor is due to the message size increasing in each step as messages get concatenated. Compare this to reduce where message size is a constant for operators like .

All-Gather 

The all-gather communication pattern is used to collect data from all processing units and to store the collected data on all processing units.

It can be thought of in multiple ways. The first is as an all-reduce operation with concatenation as the operator, in the same way that gather can be represented by reduce. The second is as a gather-operation followed by a broadcast of the new message of size .

Scatter 

The scatter communication pattern is used to distribute data from one processing unit to all the processing units. It differs from broadcast, in that it does not send the same message to all processing units. Instead it splits the message and delivers one part of it to each processing unit.

Given  processing units , a fixed processing unit  that holds the message . We want to transport the message  onto . The same implementation concerns as for gather apply.

All-to-all 

All-to-all is the most general communication pattern. For , message  is the message that is initially stored on node  and has to be delivered to node . We can express all communication primitives that do not use operators through all-to-all.

This is achieved through   rounds of direct message exchange. For  power of 2, in communication round  , node  exchanges messages with node  .

If the message size is small and latency dominates the communication, a hypercube algorithm can be used to distribute the messages in time  .

Runtime Overview 
This table gives an overview over the best known asymptotic runtimes, assuming we have free choice of network topology.

Example topologies we want for optimal runtime are binary tree, binomial tree, hypercube.

In practice, we have to adjust to the available physical topologies, e.g. dragonfly, fat tree, grid network (references other topologies, too).

More information under Network topology.

For each operation, the optimal algorithm can depend on the input sizes . For example, broadcast for short messages is best implemented using a binomial tree whereas for long messages a pipelined communication on a balanced binary tree is optimal.

The complexities stated in the table depend on the latency  and the communication cost per word  in addition to the number of processing units  and the input message size per node . The # senders and # receivers columns represent the number of senders and receivers that are involved in the operation respectively. The # messages column lists the number of input messages and the Computations? column indicates if any computations are done on the messages or if the messages are just delivered without processing. Complexity gives the asymptotic runtime complexity of an optimal implementation under free choice of topology.

Notes

References 

Parallel computing
Algorithms
Distributed computing